Massey Branch is a stream in Callaway and Montgomery Counties in the U.S. state of Missouri. It is a tributary of the Loutre River.

Massey Branch most likely has the name of the family of Thomas Massey, a pioneer citizen.

See also
List of rivers of Missouri

References

Rivers of Callaway County, Missouri
Rivers of Montgomery County, Missouri
Rivers of Missouri